Elizabeth Ekadashi is a 2014 Marathi movie directed by Paresh Mokashi. and written by Madhugandha Kulkarni. The movie, which tells the tale of a child and his set of friends living in Pandharpur, has been selected as the opening film of the Indian Panorama section at the International Film Festival of India, 2014. The film had national release on 14 November 2014.

Plot
Dnyanesh and Mukta are siblings who with their mother and grandmother live in the pilgrim town of Pandharpur, Maharashtra. The title's eponymous 'Elizabeth' is a bicycle that is gifted to the talented Dnyanesh by his father after whose death Dnyanesh takes to supporting his mother. Dnyanesh asks his mother that can he set up a shop to overcome their financial needs but his mother urges him to concentrate on studies rather than business. The family lives in straitened financial conditions and on the eve of Ashadhi, financial necessity forces Dnyanesh's mother to sell Elizabeth to a pawn-shark. Dnyanesh and his group of friends must now find a way to recover Elizabeth which forms the rest of the movie.

Cast
 Shrirang Mahajan as Dnyanesh
 Sayali Bhandarkavathekar as Mukta
 Pushkar Lonarkar 
 Nandita Dhuri
 Vanmala Kinikar
 Chaitanya Badve 
 Durgesh Badve-Mahajan
 Chaitanya Kulkarni
 Ashwini Bhalekar
 Dhananjay (Prasad) Godbole
 Anil Kamble
 Aniruddha Prasad Kulkarni

Music

One song in the film- "Dagad Dagad" was composed by the legendary music Director Anand Modak & was sung by Sharayu Date.

Release
Released on Children's day, 2014, Elizabeth Ekadashi was well received by the audience across Maharashtra. The film did a business of ₹ 2.56 crores in just three days.

Accolades
 National Film Award for Best Children's Film
 Government of Maharashtra Sant Tukaram Best International Marathi Film Award, Pune International Film Festival 2015
 Best Film at Zee Chitragaurav Awards 2015

References

External links
 
 
 

2014 films
Best Children's Film National Film Award winners
2010s Marathi-language films
Films directed by Paresh Mokashi
Films scored by Anand Modak